Teclaiidae is a family of cnidarians belonging to the order Leptothecata.

Genera:
 Parateclaia Bouillon, Pagès, Gili, Palanques, Puig & Heussner, 2000
 Teclaia Gili, Bouillon, Pages, Palanques & Puig, 1999

References

Leptothecata
Cnidarian families